Szilágyi is a Hungarian surname. It also refers to a county in the Kingdom of Hungary by the name of Szilágy. The region has been part of Romania since 1918.

Description 
The actual name means either from the county of Szilágy or of the noble clan of Szilagyi.  The original Hungarian spelling of the name is "Szilágyi"; it has been modified to "Silaghi" in its Romanian variation. The Hungarian letters "Sz" and "gy" are replaced by the similarly pronounced "S" and "g" respectively in the Romanian version of the name.

The Szilágyi clan exerted a strong influence over this region of Europe during the late to middle 14th century.

People with the surname

House of Szilágyi
Ágnes Szilágyi
Áron Szilágyi
Dezső Szilágyi
Erzsébet Szilágyi
Gábor Szilágyi
György Szilágyi
Ilona Szilágyi
István Szilágyi
János György Szilágyi
Katalin Szilágyi
László Szilágyi (judoka)
László Szilágyi (politician)
Liliána Szilágyi
Loránd Szilágyi
Michael Szilágyi
Péter Szilágyi (footballer)
Péter Szilágyi (politician, 1954)
Péter Szilágyi (politician, 1981)
Zoltán Szilágyi
Zoltán Szilágyi Varga
 Zsolt Szilágyi (footballer)
 Zsolt Szilágyi (politician)
Čaba Silađi
Michaela Szilágyiová

References

External links 
  http://www.surnameweb.org/Szilagyi/surnames.htm

Hungarian-language surnames